Loyola Marymount University (LMU) is a private Jesuit and Marymount research university in Los Angeles, California. It is located on the west side of the city near Playa Vista. LMU is the parent school to Loyola Law School, which is located in downtown Los Angeles.

LMU offers 55 major and 59 minor undergraduate degrees and programs across six undergraduate colleges. The Graduate Division offers 47 master's degree programs, one education doctorate, one doctorate in juridical science, a Juris Doctor and 13 credential programs.

LMU's sports teams are called the Lions and compete at the NCAA Division I level as members of the West Coast Conference in 20 sports.

History

Loyola Marymount University is the product of a merger in 1973 between Loyola College, founded in 1917, and Marymount College, founded in 1932, with its roots in Marymount School which was founded in 1923.

St. Vincent's College
The present university is the product of the first institution of higher learning in Southern California, St. Vincent's College, which was founded and run by the Vincentians until 1911.

In 1865, the Vincentian Fathers were commissioned by Bishop Thaddeus Amat y Brusi to found St. Vincent's College for Boys in Los Angeles. Father John Asmuth was the first President Rector. Classes were held for two years in the Lugo Adobe on the east side of the Plaza while a new building was being finished. The historic home, aptly donated by Don Vicente Lugo, was one of few two-story adobes then in town. The house stood in the empty lot across Alameda Street between the Plaza and Union Station (near Olvera Street).

Later, the brick building was replaced with a larger one in stone. The 7th Street property, now called St. Vincent's Place, took up the block bounded by Fort (Broadway), 6th, Hill, and 7th streets. When St. Vincent's later moved to a new campus, the old building became US Army Headquarters, and in 1907, the large Bullock's department store was built and operated here until 1983. In 1869, St. Vincent's was accredited by the state.

In 1887, the college moved to a new, more majestic campus—bounded by Grand Avenue, Washington Boulevard, Hope Street, and 18th—which would have a chapel, residence hall, cottages, and a traditional brick-and-ivy complex housing classrooms and lecture halls. Like the second college building by Pershing Square, the new retained a tall, central tower topped with St. Vincent's trademark mansard roof.

While the campus underwent many expansions, the athletic program grew, and the Catholic Collegiates competed against Occidental's Presbyterians and USC's Methodists. St. Vincent's athletes were also recruited into professional sports. During this era, from St. Vincent's College graduated many alumni who would become famous in the history of Los Angeles, among whom were Isidore Dockweiler, Eugene Biscailuz and Leo Carrillo.

In 1911, the Vincentians, who had led the college since its founding the century before, were replaced with the Jesuits, who quickly moved the college to a larger property. As planning began on developing a 20th-century university, enrollment was folded into a new college, briefly called "Los Angeles College" that would soon evolve into Loyola. The old campus became St. Vincent's School. In 1922, St. Vincent's campus was sold. Over time, the historic buildings of old St. Vincent's College have been torn down and replaced by, for example, the Grand Olympic Auditorium (1924) and large, open parking lots.

Beginnings of Loyola in L.A.
When the Vincentians pulled out of educational ministry in Los Angeles in 1911, Bishop Thomas Conaty asked the Jesuits to come to Los Angeles and take over St. Vincent's College. Not wishing to assume any of the college's debt, the Jesuits instead founded Los Angeles College in 1911. They simultaneously opened their high school division (Loyola High School) and folded the board, faculty, and students of St. Vincent's College into Los Angeles College at a new location made up of several bungalows at Avenue 52, Highland Park, Los Angeles.

Father Richard A. Gleeson was the first Jesuit President but the board of the college was initially composed of Vincentian Fathers. Rapid growth prompted the Jesuits to seek a new campus on Venice Boulevard in 1917; with this move, the name of the school was changed back to St. Vincent's College. However, in 1918 the name was once again changed to Loyola College of Los Angeles.

Graduate instruction began in 1920 with the foundation of a separate law school. Though instruction at the undergraduate level remained exclusive to male students, women were admitted to the law school. The law school was the second in Los Angeles to admit Jewish students. (USC's law school had done so at least since 1910.)

In 1928, the undergraduate division of Loyola relocated, under then-President Joseph A. Sullivan, S.J., to the present Westchester campus and achieved university status in 1930, becoming Loyola University of Los Angeles. Loyola Law School did not move with the rest of the university, but moved later to another location just west of downtown Los Angeles.

World War II had a significant impact on Loyola University. As enrollment began to drop, Father Edward Whelan, president at the time, brokered a deal with the US Army to form an officer training program for both Army and Navy officers. The contract allowed the university to remain open during the war and enrollment hit all-time highs as a result of returning veterans taking advantage of the G.I. Bill in the mid-to-late 1940s. Additionally, Father Whelan recognized the grave injustice of the Japanese internment camps during World War II. At Loyola, he hired and housed many Japanese Americans returning to Los Angeles after their release from the camps. 
In 1949, Father Charles Cassassa was named president and began one of the most consequential presidencies in the university's history. His work included the formation of a graduate division on the Westchester campus in June 1950, graduate work having formed an integral part of the Teacher Education Program during the preceding two years, expanding campus infrastructure. He then established the Institute of Human Relations to promote improved racial relations in business and in government. Future Mayor of Los Angeles Tom Bradley attended the first year-long program held by the Institute of Human Relations and remained lifelong friends with Father Cassassa.

Father Cassassa also continued Father Whelan's legacy of combating racial injustice. In 1950, he forced the school's football team to forfeit an away game against Texas Western since the school's rules prevented African-American players, such as Loyola's Bill English, to play on their field. During the Cassassa era, the law school moved to its current campus, designed by Frank Gehry, in 1964. Loyola University also continued as an all-male school until its merger with Marymount College in 1973. There were, however, several notable exceptions.

The first exception occurred during the summer months, when the Loyola faculty offered classes for religious women (Catholic nuns) seeking undergraduate degrees. Many sisters from across Los Angeles and Orange County acquired their undergraduate degrees from Loyola. Additionally, women were admitted to several of Loyola's graduate programs prior to the affiliation and merger with Marymount College. Furthermore, there were several female students admitted to Marymount College who later matriculated into Loyola University during the two schools' five-year affiliation prior to 1973, primarily into Engineering and Business majors which Marymount did not offer.

Beginnings of Marymount in L.A.
In separate though parallel developments, the Religious of the Sacred Heart of Mary began teaching local young women in 1923. Having been invited by Bishop John Cantwell, seven sisters of the Religious of the Sacred Heart of Mary, under the leadership of Mother Cecilia Rafter, formed what was first an elementary school and, shortly thereafter, a high school. Within ten years, so many young women wished to continue their education with the Marymount sisters beyond high school that Marymount Junior College opened as an all-women's school on the Westwood campus of Marymount High School in 1933.

Mother Gertrude Cain was the first president of the junior college and guided its development into a four-year college in 1948, assuming the name Marymount College of Los Angeles. In 1960, having outgrown its shared Westwood campus, Marymount College moved both its two-year program and its four-year program to the Palos Verdes Peninsula in southwestern Los Angeles. The Palos Verdes campus became Marymount California University.

In 1967 Sister Raymunde McKay, the president of Marymount College, extended an invitation to Sister Mary Felix Montgomery, General Superior of the Sisters of Saint Joseph of Orange, to merge Marymount College with St. Joseph College of Orange, a four-year liberal arts college for women religious run by the Sisters of Saint Joseph of Orange, which Sister Montgomery accepted. St. Joseph College was originally formed as St. Joseph Teacher's College, a junior college affiliated with The Catholic University of America in 1953. In 1959 it was incorporated as an autonomous, four-year institution and assumed the St. Joseph College name.

In 1968 Marymount and St. Joseph's Colleges merged under the Marymount name with an agreement that the traditions and heritage of both the Religious of the Sacred Heart of Mary and the Sisters of St. Joseph of Orange would be carried in the Marymount name. As part of the Marymount College Agreement, Marymount College was administered "co-equally" by the Religious of the Sacred Heart of Mary and the Sisters of St. Joseph of Orange as members of both communities partnered in the governing, staffing, and teaching of Marymount College.

Subsequently, St. Joseph College of Orange was renamed Marymount College of Orange. During the academic year, it remained a college for women religious seeking their baccalaureate degrees; college courses were offered to men and women during the summers at the Orange campus. The same year, Marymount College began its affiliation with Loyola University, moving its four-year program at the Palos Verdes campus to the Westchester campus of Loyola University. Marymount College then operated on three campuses: Palos Verdes retained its two-year program, Orange remained a campus for religious women in Orange County, and Westchester was a campus for both lay and religious women.

Affiliation and merger of Loyola and Marymount
By the mid-1960s, Loyola University of Los Angeles had unsuccessfully petitioned the Archbishop of Los Angeles, Cardinal James Francis McIntyre, to allow coeducation at Loyola for several years. In 1967, however, Sister McKay, President of Marymount College, received permission from Cardinal McIntyre to begin affiliation with Loyola University on Loyola's Westchester campus. Sister McKay and Father Charles Cassassa, President of Loyola University, held a joint press conference to announce the affiliation.

The affiliation of Marymount College and Loyola University began in 1968 when Marymount's four-year program moved to Loyola's Westchester campus; this arrangement (two independent schools on one campus) continued for five years. In 1970, the Student Governments of Loyola University (ASLU—Associated Students of Loyola University) and Marymount College (ASMC—Associated Students of Marymount College) joined to form the Associated Students of Loyola and Marymount (ASLM).

After five years of sharing faculties and facilities, Loyola University and Marymount College merged and assumed the name Loyola Marymount University in 1973. Through this union, the expanded university maintained the century-old mission of Catholic higher education in Los Angeles and incorporated the educational traditions of the Jesuits, Marymount sisters, and Orange sisters into one institution. At this time, ASLM became known as the Associated Students of Loyola Marymount University (ASLMU).

Father Donald Merrifield, who became president of Loyola University in 1969, continued as the university's president. The academic vice president of Marymount College, Sister Renee Harrangue, became the provost. During Father Merrifield's tenure as president thirteen new buildings were constructed on Loyola Marymount's main campus. Father Merrifield oversaw the expansion of Loyola Law School's campus in Pico-Union, near downtown Los Angeles. Merrifield and the university commissioned architect Frank Gehry to design the new campus, which was needed to accommodate increased enrollment.

Merrifield also implemented a number of programs to increase minority enrollment, such as financial aid packages and scholarships, and added African American and Latino studies programs. He stepped down as president of Loyola Marymount in 1984, but remained the university's chancellor until 2002.

Marymount College's four-year program subsequently separated from its two-year program. The Marymount two-year program remained incorporated as a separate institution and received accreditation in 1971 as the independently run Marymount College, Palos Verdes, which is currently operates in Rancho Palos Verdes, California. In 2010, Marymount College, Palos Verdes received accreditation as a four-year institution.

With the merger of Loyola University and Marymount College in 1973, the Sisters of St. Joseph of Orange joined the Society of Jesus and the Religious of the Sacred Heart of Mary as one of the sponsoring religious communities of Loyola Marymount University. Marymount College of Orange was renamed the Orange Campus of Loyola Marymount University. The Orange Campus offered continuing education and summer courses to men and women through the 1980s.

Recent history
In 2007, the university reestablished its presence in Orange County, California when the Theological Studies Department began offering a two-year master's program in Pastoral Theology in Orange, California. The first cohort graduated in the Spring of 2009, and three additional cohorts completed a three-year master's degree in Pastoral Theology until the cohort program ended in 2018. The classes were held in the Marywood offices of the Diocese of Orange and then at the Diocese's Christ Cathedral campus, both not far from the now defunct Orange Campus of Loyola Marymount University.

On March 1, 2010, Loyola Marymount President, Father Robert B. Lawton, announced his retirement as head of the university, effective at the end of the academic year in May 2010. Lawton cited health problems, including a slow recovery from a 2009 back surgery, as the main reason for his departure. He had served as president for eleven years, beginning his tenure in 1999.

David W. Burcham, a 1984 graduate of Loyola Law School became the first lay president in the school's history. Burcham held the office for five years, from 2010 to 2015. Burcham, who presided over LMU's centennial in 2011, opted not to stay on after his term ended. The LMU board of trustees elected Timothy Law Snyder, as the 16th president and he took office on June 1, 2015.

Campus
LMU is located on the Del Rey Hills in the Westchester neighborhood of Los Angeles. It overlooks the former site of Hughes Aircraft. The original  were donated to the university by Harry Culver. Xavier Hall, named for St. Francis Xavier, and St. Robert's Hall, named after St. Robert Bellarmine, a cardinal and Doctor of the Church, were the first two buildings to be built on the current Westchester Campus. Following their completion in 1929, Xavier Hall housed both the Jesuit Faculty and the students at the time while St. Robert's Hall served as the academic and administrative building.

Sacred Heart Chapel and the Regents Bell Tower were the next non-residential structures to be built on the campus (1953–55). The Malone Student Center, named after Lorenzo M. Malone, an alumnus of the university and former dean of students and treasurer of the university, was completed in 1958 and renovated in 1996. LMU now houses 36 academic, athletic, administrative, and event facilities as well as twelve on-campus residence halls and six on-campus apartment complexes. The campus houses four large open grass areas not reserved exclusively for athletic play.

The university's acquisition of University Hall in 2000 brought the campus a new entrance as well as much-needed office and classroom space. University Hall was originally constructed for Hughes Aircraft as their world headquarters. It was then sold to the university. 

LMU acquired the  building in January 2000 from Raytheon, which bought Hughes Aircraft. LMU completed the interior remodel in April 2001. The building, which houses the university's Bellarmine College of Liberal Arts, is constructed of steel and concrete and is divided into seven structures above ground.

In 2022The Princeton Review ranked LMU as having the fourth-most beautiful campus in America. CampusSqueeze college e-zine ranked LMU as having the third-most beautiful campus in America. In 2022

Sustainability
LMU has a large solar electric rooftop array that generates 868,000 kilowatt-hours of electricity annually, providing 6% of the annual campus electrical needs. The university purchased another 6 percent of its electrical energy through Renewable Energy Credits.

There are three LEED-certified buildings on campus, including the William H. Hannon Library. All new and renovated roofing projects include installation of a highly reflective white membrane cool roof.

Student sustainability jobs are available in the recycling program. Loyola Marymount earned a grade of a "B−" on the College Sustainability Report Card 2010, published by the Sustainable Endowments Institute.

Academics
In addition to being the parent school of Loyola Law School in downtown Los Angeles, Loyola Marymount is the home to six colleges and schools. LMU offers an Air Force ROTC program, an Honors Program in which the students have a different core curriculum, and several year-long, semester, and summer study abroad programs across the Americas, Europe, Africa, Asia, and Australia. Admission to LMU is competitive. Students from every U.S. state attend LMU.

Admissions

U.S. News & World Report classifies Loyola Marymount's selectivity as "more selective."

For Fall 2022, LMU received over 20,000 freshman applications—admitting 38% and enrolling a class of 1,710 first year students. Members of the Class of 2022 earned an average high school GPA of 3.90 with the middle 50% scoring between 1290 and 1420 on the SAT.

Rankings

 U.S. News & World Report'''s "Best Colleges 2021" ranked Loyola Marymount tied for 66th in the U.S. among national universities. U.S. News & World Report also ranked Loyola Marymount tied for 31st in Best Undergraduate Teaching, tied for 38th Best for Veterans, and 98th Best Value school in the national universities category, and tied for 26th best undergraduate engineering program at schools where doctorates are not offered.
 The Wall Street Journal, in its "2020 WSJ/THE College Rankings," ranked Loyola Marymount 90th in the country.
 The Hollywood Reporter, in its "Top 25 American Film Schools" 2014 edition, 2015 edition,  2016 edition, 2017 edition, 2018 edition, and 2019 edition ranked Loyola Marymount eighth in the country, and in its 2020 edition, ranked it seventh in the country.
The Wrap ranked LMU eighth in the country in its Top 50 Film Schools of 2018.

Bellarmine College of Liberal Arts
The Bellarmine College of Liberal Arts includes twenty-five undergraduate programs of study as well as five graduate programs. It embodies the wider university goals of liberal education, which is the heart of the university's core curriculum for all undergraduates. The college is named for Saint Robert Bellarmine.

College of Communication and Fine Arts
The College of Communication and Fine Arts offers majors in Art History, Communication Studies, Dance, Music, Studio Arts, and Theatre Arts as well as a graduate program in Marital and Family Therapy. Students are able to choose a specific emphasis within the studio art (STAR) major such as drawing, painting, photography, art education, sculpture, and multimedia.

There are beginning (lower division) and advanced (upper division) courses offered in the STAR department that explore fine art practices in two-dimensional design, ceramics, typography, visual thinking, and graphic design. The current dean of the College of Communication and Fine Arts is Bryant Alexander.

The Department of Music includes two choruses. The 100-voice Concert Choir presents music for mixed voices. The smaller, more advanced Consort Singers presents varying styles of choral music and frequently appears in the Los Angeles area as the ambassador group for the university.

Pulitzer Prize-winning playwright Beth Henley teaches playwriting in the Theatre Department. Colin Hanks transferred to LMU from the acting program and Chapman University. Linda Cardellini and Busy Philipps are also alumni from the Theatre Department. Many of the faculty in the department are currently working in the industry.

College of Business Administration
The College of Business Administration teaches effective principles and practice of business through foundation building, undergraduate programs, and flexible graduate programs for advancing professionals. It is home to eight undergraduate programs of study as well as an MBA program for graduate studies.

Rankings
 LMU's Part-Time MBA Program was ranked 6th nationwide by Bloomberg Businessweek in their 2013 rankings
 U.S. News ranked Loyola in its 2017 list of "America's Best Colleges" as tied for 94th in the nation for Best Undergraduate Business Program.

Frank R. Seaver College of Science and Engineering
The Frank R. Seaver College of Science and Engineering sees its purpose to be the education of principled leaders. It contains thirteen undergraduate programs of study as well as six graduate programs. Graduate programs are offered in civil, electrical and mechanical engineering, in environmental science, in computer science, in systems engineering, and in dual program called systems engineering and leadership (SE+MBA).

Undergraduate students experience close interactions with the faculty as a result of small class sizes. Students conduct sophisticated state-of-the-art research by working very closely with their professors and they participate in various undergraduate student research conferences and student design competitions.

School of Education
The School of Education at Loyola Marymount has four undergraduate and nine graduate programs of study including a Doctorate in Education (Ed.D.). Many students seeking a credential in Elementary Education major in the Bellarmine College of Liberal Arts' Liberal Studies program, which is designed to educate one in the various arts and letters they will be teaching children.

School of Film and Television
The School of Film and Television was established in 2003 by consolidating LMU's programs in film and television. Admission to the undergraduate program is competitive, with 19% of applicants admitted to the program. It is the seventh highest ranked film program in America, according to The Hollywood Reporter and the fifth highest ranked program, according to College Factual (USA Today). In 2018, it opened a 35,000 square foot facility, primarily for graduate film students. The Playa Vista campus includes three greenscreen studios, eight Avid editing rooms and a Foley stage. In the Spring of 2020, dean Peggy Rajski broke ground on the Howard B. Fitzpatrick Pavilion, a 25,000-square-foot structure equipped with a screening theater, a camera-teaching stage and a motion-capture workspace, which is due to open in the Fall of 2021. Unlike some other film programs, LMU film students own the intellectual property rights to the films they create while they are in college.

The School of Film and Television offers bachelor's degrees in Film and Television Production, Screenwriting, Animation, and Recording Arts along with a minor in Film Studies and also Master's programs in Writing and Producing for Television, Film and Television Production, and Feature Film Screenwriting. A range of advanced facilities and equipment are available to students, including two soundstages, advanced editing labs, a fully equipped theater, and top-of-the-line camera equipment including five RED One Cameras.

The School of Film and Television also offers a wide range of internship opportunities through more than 400 partner companies.

Notable alumni from LMU's film school include Barbara Broccoli, producer of James Bond films since 1990, James Wong, Brian Helgeland, writer/director of the Jackie Robinson biopic 42, Francis Lawrence, director of three of The Hunger Games films, and David Mirkin, an executive producer and showrunner for The Simpsons.

Loyola Law School
Loyola Law School's Frank Gehry-designed campus is in the Pico-Union neighborhood west of downtown Los Angeles and is separate from the Westchester main university campus.

Including its day and evening J.D. programs, Loyola was the first California law school with a pro bono graduation requirement, under which students perform 40 hours of pro bono work.

Organization
The governing body of the university is the school's independent board of trustees, headed by a chairman. The university's executive officer is the president. Prior to 2009, a prerequisite to serve as the university's president was membership in the Society of Jesus; however, the board of trustees voted to allow educators not a part of the Jesuit Order to become president. These changes were made at the recommendation of the American Assistancy of Jesuits, the collective body of Jesuits in the United States in response to the declining number of Jesuits as well as those prepared to serve as the president of a major university. See a list of past presidents.

The president is assisted by the chancellor, assistant to the president, director internal audit, the vice president for mission and ministry (under whose direction the Office of Campus Ministry and the Center for Ignatian Spirituality operates) and the vice president for intercultural affairs. The executive vice president & provost reports directly to the president and oversees all campus operations.

The university cabinet consists of: the president, executive vice president & provost, senior vice president & chief academic officer (under whose direction the deans of the Bellarmine College of Liberal Arts, College of Business Administration, College of Communication and Fine Arts, Seaver College of Science and Engineering, School of Education, School of Film and Television, and University Libraries operate), senior vice president for administration, senior vice president & chief financial officer, senior vice president for student affairs, senior vice president for university relations, and senior vice president Fritz B. Burns Dean of Loyola Law School.

The Jesuit Community is headed by a rector (appointed by the Superior General of the Society of Jesus); the Religious of the Sacred Heart of Mary are led by local coordinator who report to the provincial superior of the Western American Province; and the Sisters of St. Joseph of Orange are led by a local superior who reports to the general superior of their congregation. Each of the three sponsoring religious communities is represented on the board of trustees.

Sponsoring religious orders
LMU is sponsored primarily by three religious orders that have long been associated with education, the Society of Jesus, the Religious of the Sacred Heart of Mary, and the Sisters of St. Joseph of Orange. However, other religious orders such as the Order of Our Lady of Mount Carmel (Carmelites) and the Sisters of Saint Louis have members employed on campus.

Society of Jesus
The Jesuit Community of LMU is the largest in the California Province of the Society of Jesus. The campus's Jesuits were housed in Xavier Hall until the recent completion of the new Jesuit Community Complex. LMU is home to 51 Jesuits (2006–2007 academic school year) holding various positions in administrative, staff, and faculty positions throughout the university. Even though there are a lot of Jesuits on the campus, the majority of them are not involved with school.

Religious of the Sacred Heart of Mary
The Religious of the Sacred Heart of Mary also house several religious sisters adjacent campus. From 1968 until 1999 the sisters lived on campus in the Thomas and Dorothy Leavey Center. In 1999, they donated the building to the university and moved into residential houses off campus. The Western American provincial center, which had been in the Leavey center, was moved to Montebello. The Marymount Sisters sponsor the Marymount Institute for Faith, Culture, and the Arts which attempts to preserve the transformative educational tradition of the Religious of the Sacred Heart of Mary and promotes a dialogue between faith and culture as expressed in fine, performing, literary and communication arts.

Sisters of Saint Joseph of Orange
Like the Jesuits and Marymount Sisters, the Sisters of St. Joseph of Orange play a great role in preserving the Catholic identity of the school. Several sisters of the order reside adjacent to the campus, working in administrative, staff, and faculty roles.

Campus ministry

Loyola Marymount's Office of Campus Ministry is a component to the promotion of the university's mission and identity. Founded in 1911 as the University Chaplain, this division became known as Campus Ministry in 1973 with a stipulation that the Director would be a Jesuit. By 1986 this requirement was waived when Sr. Margaret Mary Dolan, R.S.H.M. became the director. Dolan, an alumna of Marymount College's class of 1958, received her Master's from LMU in 1974 and also served the university as a campus minister, director of alumni relations, residence hall minister, and alumni chaplain since 1973.

In 2008, as part of the university's Centennial Capital Campaign, it was announced that an $8 million fundraising goal was set to endow the office as the "Peg Dolan, RSHM Campus Ministry Center" in honor of Dolan's contributions to the university. The same year, the university asked her to address the class of 2008 at the undergraduate commencement exercises and she was awarded an honorary doctorate. At the dedication ceremony in September 2008, over 700 alumni returned to campus to honor her legacy at the university. When Dolan died in 2009, more than 1,000 people returned to campus for two days of liturgies celebrating her life.

Located at the north end of the university, Sacred Heart Chapel is the main worship space on campus. A basilica-style church, Sacred Heart has two side altars and the Mary chapel, which is located behind the crucifix, in addition to the main chapel space. The chapel is lined by tall stained-glass windows. Each window bears the seal of one of the 28 other Jesuit universities in the United States; additionally, following the 1973 merger, edged glass window of the other four Marymount colleges and universities in the United States were added.

Academy of Catholic Thought and Imagination
The Academy of Catholic Thought and Imagination (ACTI) at Loyola Marymount University is a hub for scholarship, interdisciplinary research, pedagogy, and outreach on LMU's campus and in the southwest United States. ACTI sponsors and co-sponsors events, supports interdisciplinary dialogue within the university, and publishes academic work promoting its mission. Founded in April 2014 and Directed by Dr. Brian Treanor, ACTI has been sponsoring and organizing events since April 2015.

The Marymount Institute for Faith, Culture, and the Arts
Founded in 1991, the Marymount Institute encourages interdisciplinary and intercultural scholarly and artistic activity in the form of research, publication, exhibits, performances, conferences, seminars, and lectures.

2008 saw the opening of the Marymount Institute Press. Itself an imprint of Tsehai Publishers and Distributors, the MIP was founded by the Ethiopian-born journalist, publisher, and social activist, Elias Wondimu, and already has two publications to its credit: "Panim el Panim: Facing Genesis, Visual Midrash" and "A Journey into Love: Meditating with Piers Plowman".

The President's Marymount Institute Professor in Residence is Nobel Laureate Wole Soyinka.

Athletics

Athletic teams at Loyola Marymount are known as Lions; the school's primary athletic affiliation is with the West Coast Conference. While LMU has had success in several sports, it is probably best remembered for its men's basketball teams between 1985 and 1990, with Paul Westhead as coach and for the death of star player Hank Gathers (#44), who collapsed during the second round of the WCC tournament on March 4, 1990, and for his friendship with teammate Bo Kimble (#30). Their jerseys have been retired at LMU.

Especially well-remembered was the 1990 team, led by Gathers and Kimble until tragedy struck in the WCC tournament. Gathers collapsed during a game and died due to a previously diagnosed heart condition. Playing for their fallen teammate, the Lions advanced to the Elite Eight (regional final) of the NCAA tournament before falling to eventual champions UNLV.

The primary indoor athletic facility is the Gersten Pavilion.
Former Los Angeles Angels of Anaheim pitcher C. J. Wilson attended and pitched at Loyola Marymount in 2001. LMU Softball holds many records. It owns more titles than any other PCSC (Pacific Coast Softball Conference) team, with three in 2003, 2005, and 2007. In 2007, Tiffany Pagano and LMU beat UCLA 4–2 in the Los Angeles regional in the NCAA Tournament, to mark their first win over the Bruins, and the first time that UCLA had not won a regional and advanced to the Women's College World Series.

Student government
ASLMU, The Associated Students of Loyola Marymount University, is the functioning student government. The government body is composed of an Executive Branch, composed of the Management Team and Cabinet Departments; a Legislative Branch, composed of the Senate; and a Judicial Branch, composed of the Judicial Committee. The only elected positions are those of the President, Vice President and the Senate. Unlike the senators, the President and Vice President have a limited term of two years.

Student media

The Los Angeles Loyolan
The Los Angeles Loyolan newspaper has been published for 100 years. It was originally titled The Cinder for the cinders kicked up by the trains passing the downtown campus of St. Vincent's College. In 2007, The Loyolan moved from its long-standing weekly Wednesday publication schedule to a twice a week—Monday and Thursday—schedule. As of 2020, publication is completely digital.

The paper is supported by its advertising department, which has historically paid from 80% to 100% of the cost of publication. Its regular sections include News, Opinion, Sports, Social Justice, and Life+Arts. Special sections include Business, Travel, Cartoon and the parody section, named The Bluff after LMU's distinctive landmark.

In August 2013, the student staff of the Loyolan took the publication to a digital-focused format, publishing stories and video segments online daily.

This transition will take place over a three-year period in which the staff will focus on mobile, social media and the web. As part of this digital focus, the Loyolan announced that beginning in the spring semester of 2015 there will only be one print edition published per week.

Tower Yearbook

Over the years, the Loyola University Los Angeles yearbook was known by several titles, including the Lair Annual. After the merger the university began publishing the annual Tower Yearbook'' which is financed through a mandatory annual student yearbook fee (collected along with tuition).

The student-run yearbook at Loyola Marymount University was named "Best in Show" at the 85th Annual National College Media Conference in St. Louis, Mo. on October 30. "The Tower" took first place in the "Yearbook 300-Plus" category among other prestigious colleges from around the nation.

In 2016, the National Scholastic Press Association awarded the Tower yearbook the Pacemaker Award. SEEK, the winning issue was headed by Mali McGuire the editor-in-chief for the year. The 2015-16 yearbook was also awarded the Gold Crown by the Columbia Scholastic Press Association.

Campus radio
KXLU (88.9 FM) is an FM radio station broadcasting out of Loyola Marymount University in southwest Los Angeles, California. It was first on the air in 1957, and recently celebrated its 60th anniversary. It is a non-commercial college radio station that plays many styles of music broadly classified under rock, specialty, fine arts, and Latin jazz.

ROAR Studios
ROAR Studios is the newest student media on-campus. It provides a forum for student produced programming to be broadcast both via the on-campus cable TV system and, eventually, via the Public-access television cable TV system(s).

ROAR Studios is the only TV station made for, and run by, students on the LMU campus. The station provides student produced programming every two weeks, with its primetime block from 10:00 p.m. to 2:00 a.m. every night.

Service organizations

Center for Service and Action
CSA also oversees LMU's student service organizations. The ten service organizations work to help the university and surrounding community of Los Angeles. The members of these organizations make themselves available for on-campus service as well as on-going commitments to serve at specific non-profit agencies in Southern California. Each organization has a moderator and a chaplain (though in some of the organizations the same priest or woman religious serves as both moderator and chaplain).

CSA coordinates communication between the leadership of these organizations, the Service Organization Council. CSA also coordinates the distribution of the On-Campus Service Requests.

The organizations and their respective dates of founding are Crimson Circle (1929), Belles (1960), Gryphon Circle (1968), Ignatians (1981), Sursum Corda (1992), Marians (2003), Magis (2003), Creare (2009), Espérer (2012), and Agapé (2017).

Emergency Medical Services 
LMU EMS is the on-campus emergency medical services program, consisting of volunteer full-time undergraduate students who are nationally certified EMTs. The organization is 1 of 27 active members of the National Collegiate Emergency Medical Services Foundation (NCEMSF) and the first collegiate EMS group on the West Coast, founded in 1986. LMU EMS responds to between 300-500 medical calls on the LMU Westchester campus during the academic year, whenever the campus health clinic is closed, which establishes 24/7 medical coverage of the campus during the school year, serving more than 10,000 work hours annually. As a non-transporting agency, LMU EMS works with the Los Angeles Fire Department for transportation of patients to local emergency departments. LMU EMS was honored as the smallest school to win NCEMSF’s Organization of the Year award and Debbie Wilson, the program’s founder, was also the first woman to win NCEMSF’s Collegiate EMS Advisor of the Year award. The program has also won nine university-wide awards, and four national awards.

Fraternities and sororities
LMU is also home to a number of campus Greek organizations. The campus fraternities associated with the North American Interfraternity Council (NIC) are Alpha Delta Gamma (1952), Sigma Chi (1991), Sigma Phi Epsilon (1996), Sigma Lambda Beta (1999), Lambda Chi Alpha (2002), Beta Theta Pi (2005), Delta Sigma Phi (2012), and Phi Delta Theta (2014).

The campus sororities that are part of the National Panhellenic Conference (NPC) Affiliates are Alpha Phi (1976), Delta Gamma (1981), Delta Zeta (1986), Kappa Alpha Theta (1999), Pi Beta Phi (2002), and Alpha Chi Omega (2014).

LMU also has multi-cultural Greek organizations including Sigma Lambda Gamma (2000), and chapters from the National Pan-Hellenic Council include Alpha Kappa Alpha (2011), Delta Sigma Theta (2000), Kappa Alpha Psi, and Sigma Gamma Rho (2006).

See also

 List of Catholic universities and colleges in the United States
 List of Jesuit sites

Notelist

References

External links

 
 Panorama of historic St. Vincent's College, Loyola's original 1887 campus in downtown LA.

 
Universities and colleges in Los Angeles
Jesuit universities and colleges in the United States
Catholic universities and colleges in California
Congregation of the Sisters of Saint Joseph
Educational institutions established in 1865
1865 establishments in California
Association of Catholic Colleges and Universities
Animation schools in the United States
Schools accredited by the Western Association of Schools and Colleges
Westchester, Los Angeles
Westside (Los Angeles County)
Universities and colleges formed by merger in the United States